Dibble Bluff is a conspicuous rock bluff,  south of Marshall Cirque on the west side of White Island, Ross Archipelago. It was named by the Advisory Committee on Antarctic Names (1999) after Raymond R. Dibble of the Department of Geology, Victoria University of Wellington, who investigated volcanic eruptions and the seismicity of nearby Mount Erebus in five seasons, 1980–81 through 1984–85.

References 

Cliffs of the Ross Dependency
White Island (Ross Archipelago)